Badshahi Ashurkhana is an ashurkhana near Charminar in Hyderabad, India. It was constructed in memory of martyrdom of Imam Hussain, and is used during the mourning period of Moharram.

It is now classified as a heritage site and is looked after by the ancestral hereditary Mutawalli Mujawer Mir Nawazish Ali Moosvi 11 generations custodian along with state Department of Archaeology and Museums.

History

It was built by Muhammed Quli Qutb Shah in 1594, three years after building the Charminar. The brilliantly coloured tile-mosaic decoration was completed under Abdullah Qutb Shah in 1611.

After the Mughal conquest of Hyderabad, in a display of Sunni sectarianism, Aurangzeb used the ashurkhana as a horse stable for the Mughal cavalry, destroying part of the building in the process. The monument was restored by Asaf Jah II in the period 1764-65; a new entry gate was added, along with outer halls and wooden colonnades.

The Monument
Ashurkhana include sites like the Niyaz Khana (offering place), Naqaar Khana (drums place), Sarai Khana's (rest taking place for devotees) Abdar Khana (drinking water place), Langar Khana (food serving place), Makan-e-Mujawer (Mujawer Residence), Daftar-e-Mujawer (Mujawer office), Alawa Chabutra, and Guardroom. The Ashur Khana stands today with enamel tiles that have retained their lustre and vibrant colours even after four centuries. The intricate design in hexagons is exquisite.

References

Buildings and structures in Hyderabad, India
Tourist attractions in Hyderabad, India
Shia Islam in India
Qutb Shahi architecture
Hyderabad State
Religious buildings and structures in Hyderabad, India